The 2018 Panda Cup was the fifth edition of the under-19 association football competition.

The tournament was hosted in Chengdu between 23 and 27 May. Players born on or after 1 January 1999 are eligible to compete in the tournament.

Participating teams
In May 2018, it was announced that hosts China would join England, Hungary and Uruguay by participating in the 2018 Panda Cup.

Venues

Matches

All times are China Standard Time (UTC+08:00)

Goalscorers
2 goals

 Guo Tianyu
 Nya Kirby
 Nicolás Schiappacasse

1 goals

 Jiang Shenglong
 Liu Ruofan
 Tao Qianglong
 Xu Haoyang
 Xu Lei
 Zhu Chenjie
 Felix Nmecha
 Máté Krebsz
 Zoltán Daróczi
 Brian Ferrares
 Thiago Vecino

References

External links
 

International association football competitions hosted by China
2018 in association football
Sport in Chengdu
2018 in Chinese football
May 2018 sports events in China